Ghānim ibn Rājiḥ ibn Qatādah ibn Idrīs al-Ḥasanī was Emir of Mecca for part of 1254. He assumed the Emirate in Rabi al-Awwal 652 AH (April/May 1254) after deposing his father Rajih without resistance. He reigned until Shawwal (November/December 1254) when he was defeated by Idris ibn Qatadah and Abu Numayy ibn Abi Sa'd.

He was reportedly disproportionately tall, to the extent that his hands reached his knees while standing. The same is reported about his father.

References

13th-century Arabs
Sharifs of Mecca
Banu Qatadah